Fensfjorden is a fjord in Vestland, Norway. The fjord ends on the Masfjorden-Lindås border where it splits into two fjords: Masfjorden (which flows to the northeast into Masfjorden municipality) and Austfjorden (which flows southeast into Lindås municipality).

There is only one crossing: a car ferry from Sløvåg in Gulen to Mongstad in Lindås. The islands of Byrknesøyna, Mjømna, and Sandøyna (as well as the mainland) lie on the northern side of the fjord. The south side of the fjord includes the island of Fosøyna and the Lindås peninsula lie on the south side of the fjord.

There is a lot of ship traffic in the outer part of the Fensfjorden due to the large oil refinery and industrial area at Mongstad on the northern end of the Lindås peninsula.  Mongstad is Norway's largest port based on tonnage, and Northern Europe's largest oil port.  Roughly 2000 ships port at Mongstad in the Fensfjorden annually.

See also
 List of Norwegian fjords

References

Fjords of Vestland
Gulen
Austrheim
Masfjorden
Alver (municipality)